Amanda Brugel (born March 24, 1978) is a Canadian actress. Born and raised in Pointe-Claire (a suburb of Montreal), Quebec, she made her acting debut in the drama film Vendetta (1999). This was followed by roles in the comedy film A Diva's Christmas Carol (2000), the slasher horror film Jason X (2001), the comedy film Sex After Kids (2013), for which she won an ACTRA Award for Best Female Performance, the satirical drama film Maps to the Stars (2014), the independent drama film Room (2015), the superhero film Suicide Squad (2016), the drama film Kodachrome (2017), and the action thriller film Becky (2020).

Brugel starred as Lynnie Jordan in the Showcase soap opera Paradise Falls (2008), Michelle Krasnoff in the Citytv comedy series Seed (2013–2014), Marci Coates in the Space science fiction series Orphan Black (2015), Nina Gomez in the CBC comedy series Kim's Convenience (2016–2021), and Rita Blue in the Hulu dystopian drama series The Handmaid's Tale (2017–present). In 2021, Brugel joined the judging panel of the second season of the reality competition series Canada's Drag Race. 

Throughout her career, Brugel has received several accolades, including two Canadian Screen Awards for her work in Kim's Convenience and Canada's Drag Race, and an ACTRA Award win and Canadian Comedy Award nomination for her performance in Sex After Kids.

Early life
Brugel was born in Pointe-Claire, Quebec, Canada. Her mother is English, and immigrated to Canada, while her biological father, whom she never met, is African-American. Her mother would later marry a man of South Asian (or Southeast Asian) and of Jewish descent. He would adopt Brugel, and she has stated that she considers him her father.

She started out as a dancer, but quit when she grew to be taller than her partners. She entered the renowned Theatre Program at York University with a Fine Arts talent scholarship, and graduated with a Bachelor of Fine Arts degree in 2000.

Career
In 1999, Brugel made her acting debut in the HBO drama film Vendetta, alongside Christopher Walken. In 2000, she had a role in A Diva's Christmas Carol, a Christmas television film starring Vanessa Williams, Rozonda Thomas, and Kathy Griffin. She made her feature film debut as Geko in the slasher horror film Jason X (2001) and starred in the horror television film Kaw (2007).

Brugel appeared in guest or recurring roles in several television series, including Soul Food (2001), Wild Card (2004), Kojak (2005), Kevin Hill (2005), The Newsroom (2005), Paradise Falls (2008), MVP (2008), Saving Hope (2012), Flashpoint (2012), Nikita (2013), and Covert Affairs (2013).

In 2013, she earned critical praise for her starring role as Vanessa in the comedy film Sex After Kids. For her performance, she received an ACTRA Award for Outstanding Female Performance, and a nomination for a Canadian Comedy Award. From 2013 to 2014, she starred as Michelle Krasnoff in the Citytv comedy series Seed.

In 2014, Brugel appeared in David Cronenberg's satirical drama film Maps to the Stars, alongside Julianne Moore, and the crime thriller film The Calling, alongside Susan Sarandon. In 2015, she portrayed Marci Coates in several episodes of the Space science fiction series Orphan Black. That same year, she appeared as Officer Parker in the independent drama film Room, which earned a nomination for the Academy Award for Best Picture and won the Canadian Screen Award for Best Motion Picture.

In 2016, she appeared in the superhero film Suicide Squad. That same year, she began a recurring role as Pastor Nina Gomez in the CBC comedy series Kim's Convenience, for which she received the Canadian Screen Award for Best Guest Performance, Comedy. In 2017, she appeared in the Netflix drama film Kodachrome.

Brugel had recurring roles as Sita Petronelli in the USA Network drama series Eyewitness (2016) and as Sonia in the CBC comedy series Workin' Moms (2018), for which she was nominated for the Canadian Screen Award for Best Supporting Actress, Comedy.

Since 2017, Brugel has starred as a housekeeper named Rita, in the Hulu dystopian drama series The Handmaid's Tale, based on Margaret Atwood's acclaimed novel of the same name. As a part of the cast, she has received three nominations for the Screen Actors Guild Award for Outstanding Performance by an Ensemble in a Drama Series.

From 2019 to 2020, Brugel had a recurring role as Faith Hanlon in the USA Network teen drama series Dare Me. In 2020, she appeared as Eugenia in multiple episodes of the TNT post-apocalyptic drama series Snowpiercer, which is an adaptation of the film of the same name. Also that year, Brugel starred as Kayla in the action thriller film Becky.

In 2020, Brugel appeared as a panelist on Canada Reads, advocating for Samra Habib's memoir We Have Always Been Here. She successfully defended the memoir and won the competition.

On June 29, 2021, it was announced that Brugel, along with Brad Goreski, would join the judging panel of Canada's Drag Race for its sophomore season after season one judges Jeffrey Bowyer-Chapman and Stacey McKenzie announced their departures in March and June 2021 respectively. Alongside Goreski and main judge Brooke Lynn Hytes, Brugel will served as a rotating judge with Traci Melchor. The group of judges won a Canadian Screen Award for their work on the second season. Before the third season, Brugel was removed from the panel, with no replacement given.

Personal life
Brugel has two children from her previous marriage to Marcel Lewis.

In 2013, Brugel founded Brugs Army, a non-profit organization that focuses on improving the lives of women and children.

Filmography

Film

Television

Awards and nominations

References

External links 
 
 

1978 births
20th-century Canadian actresses
21st-century Canadian actresses
Actresses from Quebec
Black Canadian actresses
Canadian film actresses
Canadian people of African-American descent
Canadian people of English descent
Canadian stage actresses
Canadian television actresses
Living people
Participants in Canadian reality television series
People from Pointe-Claire
York University alumni
Canadian Screen Award winners